The Ljubljana railway station is the principal railway station in Ljubljana, the capital of Slovenia. It was completed on 18 April 1848, a year before the South railway, connecting Vienna and Trieste, reached Ljubljana.

Location 

Ljubljana railway station is located in the city of Ljubljana, the capital of Slovenia. It is the main railway station in the country and serves as a hub for both domestic and international trains. The station is located in the city center, making it easily accessible by foot, car, or public transportation. It is also near many popular tourist destinations such as Ljubljana Castle and the Triple Bridge. Ljubljana station is known for being a major center for music and culture, featuring a diverse selection of music, both new and classic. The venue has a regular schedule of performances, allowing patrons to plan their visits according to their personal preferences. The Central Station is also known as a pre-party spot in the city, with a relaxed atmosphere and serves as a hub for people on the go. During the day, it is a café-style venue where one can enjoy a cup of coffee or have a meal at reasonable prices, and also a source of information about the events happening in the area. In the evening, it transforms into a lively entertainment center for nightlife, with music, drinks, and snacks. It also has a smoking room for those who prefer to smoke. This location is versatile and caters to a wide range of people throughout the day.

History 

The Ljubljana railway station was completed on 18 April 1848.

James Joyce spent a night at Ljubljana railway station on his way to Trieste in October 1904, because he mistakenly thought that he had arrived at his destination. In his honour, a small monument, created by the sculptor Jakov Brdar, was erected at Ljubljana railway station on Bloomsday in 2003. The Slovenian Railway Museum is located nearby. There are plans to renovate the station as part of the Emonika urban project.

The building was renovated in 1980 by the architect Marko Mušič.

Passenger Services 

 Regional services (Treno regionale) Ljubljana – Sežana – Trieste
 EuroCity Emona: Vienna–Ljubljana and return
 Eurocity Vienna – Ljubljana – Trieste

Services

  Ticket purchase
  Information
  Baggage boxes
  Lost and found
  Baggage Loading/Unloading
  Waiting room
  WC toilets
  Bar
  Giftshop
  Telephone
  Money exchange
  Mail box

Mobility
  Staircase to the Railway platforms
  Elevator to the Railway platforms

Transport services 
  Bus station
  Taxi
  Parking (payment)

References 

Railway stations in Slovenia
Railway stations opened in 1849
Railway station
Romanesque Revival architecture in Slovenia
Center District, Ljubljana
1849 establishments in the Austrian Empire
Railway stations in Slovenia opened in 1849
19th-century architecture in Slovenia